Galina Viktorovna Timchenko (born 8 May 1962) is a Russian journalist and the executive editor and owner of Meduza.

Early life and education
Timchenko was born in Moscow on 8 May 1962. She graduated from the 3rd Moscow Medical Institute. From 1997 to 1999, she worked as an editor at the Kommersant newspaper. In 1999, she moved to the newly created online edition Lenta.ru, having risen from the monitoring officer to chief editor. In 2004, she assumed the position of editor in chief.

Career
In 2010, Harvard University conducted a study of the Russian blogosphere, and recognized Lenta.ru as the most widely quoted in the Russian-language blogs news source. According to research firm comScore, conducted in April 2013, the site Lenta.ru took 5th place in attendance of European news sites. According to Alexa.com in March 2014 Lenta.ru ranked 16th most popular in Russia.

On 12 March 2014, the owner, Alexander Mamut, fired Galina Timchenko and replaced her with Alexey Goreslavsky. 39 employees out of the total 84, including Director-general Yuliya Minder, including 32 correspondents, all 5 photo-editors and 6 administrators resigned as a result.

The employees of Lenta.ru issued a statement that the purpose of the move was to install a new Editor-in-Chief directly controlled by the Kremlin and turn the website into a propaganda tool.
In October 2014, Timchenko together with several former journalists of Lenta.ru launched a new media based in Riga, named Meduza. Timchenko told Forbes that the decision to base Meduza in Latvia was made because "it is possible to establish an independent publishing house in Latvia, while in Russia it is impossible."

Notes

External links

1962 births
20th-century Russian journalists
20th-century Russian women writers
21st-century Russian journalists
21st-century Russian women writers
Living people
Journalists from Moscow
Free Media Awards winners
Meduza
Russian activists against the 2022 Russian invasion of Ukraine
Russian newspaper editors
Russian women journalists
Women newspaper editors